Ballad of a Thin Line Man is the second album by American band Giant Sand. It was released in 1986 by record label Zippo.

Reception 
AllMusic opined that the album "documents a band that hadn't yet reached greatness, but was well on its way to something special." Trouser Press wrote that "Gelb shines on the ringing, Neil Young-inspired rockers."

Track listing
All songs written by Howe Gelb, except where noted.
"Thin Line Man"
"All Along the Watchtower" (Bob Dylan)
"Graveyard"
"Body of Water" (Gelb, William Sedelmayer, David Seeger, Scott Garber)
"Last Legs" (Gelb, James Moreland)
"You Can't Put Your Arms Around a Memory" (Johnny Thunders)
"A Hard Man to Get to Know"
"Who Am I?"
"The Chill Outside"
"Desperate Man"

References

External links 

 

1986 albums
Giant Sand albums
Fire Records (UK) albums